Genaro Rasan Snijders (born 29 July 1989) is a Dutch footballer who plays as a winger at non-professional level for FC Abcoude in the Derde Klasse. After retiring from professional football, Snijders worked as an account manager for DTG.

Club career

Youth career
Born in Amsterdam, the Netherlands, Snijders started his career at local amateur club JOS Watergraafsmeer. He moved to FC Abcoude as a youngster, an amateur club known for developing top class players like Edson Braafheid, Jeffrey Sarpong and Serginho Greene. Snijders was discovered by AZ, and joined their youth academy. Because of a conflict with Michel Doesburg, Snijders decided to leave for Vitesse's youth department, Vitesse/AGOVV. After a short time, he was promoted to the reserve squad. In 2008, he was picked for Vitesse's first team together with fellow team-mates Ricky van Wolfswinkel, Nicky Kuiper and Alexander Büttner.

Vitesse
In the 2008–09 Eredivisie season, he played mostly for the reserves, but in first months of 2009 he was picked for the first team by manager Theo Bos. On 25 January 2009, Snijders made his debut in professional football, when he replaces Mads Junker in the 87th minute in the derby match against NEC The match ended in a 0–0 draw. On 9 March 2009, he extended his contract with Vitesse to 1 July 2011.

In 2010, Snijders was loaned out to FC Omniworld. He played 11 matches for the second division side, in which he scored three goals.

Willem II
In January 2012, Snijders was loaned out to Willem II. After the end of the 2011–12 season, he turned his loan switch into a permanent deal. However, he was released after one season, having played 23 matches in which he scored twice.

Dordrecht
In November 2013, Snijders signed a deal with Eerste Divisie side FC Dordrecht until the end of the season.

FC Oss
On 1 September 2014, Snijders signed a one-year deal with Eerste Divisie side FC Oss until the end of the season.

Notts County
In July 2015, Snijders signed for League Two side Notts County on a free transfer, signing a two-year contract. He scored in the League Cup against Aston Villa.

Later career
On 21 November 2017, Snijder signed for DVS '33 in the Derde Divisie. He left there in March 2018 and moved to DHSC in Utrecht. In May 2020, he decided to return to the club where he had started his youth career: FC Abcoude, in the capacity as both a player and assistant coach.

International
Snijders played once for the Unofficial Professional Suriname national football team and scored 1 goal against Curaçao in a 3–2 defeat.

References

External links
 Voetbal International profile 
 Official Genaro Snijders profile on Vitesse.nl 

1989 births
Living people
Dutch footballers
Dutch sportspeople of Surinamese descent
SBV Vitesse players
Almere City FC players
Willem II (football club) players
FC Dordrecht players
TOP Oss players
Notts County F.C. players
Eredivisie players
Eerste Divisie players
Footballers from Amsterdam
English Football League players
Association football wingers
DVS '33 players
Dutch expatriate footballers
Surinamese expatriate footballers
Expatriate footballers in England
Derde Divisie players
Dutch expatriate sportspeople in England
Surinamese expatriate sportspeople in England
JOS Watergraafsmeer players
DHSC players